John James Hamilton, 1st Marquess of Abercorn  (Ire) (July 1756 – 27 January 1818) was an Irish peer and politician.

Background and first marriage
He was born in July 1756, the posthumous son of Captain Hon. John Hamilton and his wife Harriet, and grandson of James Hamilton, 7th Earl of Abercorn, and baptized at St George's, Hanover Square. He was educated at Harrow from 1770 to 1771. He was admitted to the Inner Temple on 15 June 1773, but did not remain there long; he was admitted to Pembroke College, Cambridge on 30 July 1773. He matriculated at Michaelmas and received his MA in 1776. There he became the friend of William Pitt the Younger, a connection that would serve him well in later years.

He married Catherine Copley (died 13 September 1791), daughter of Sir Joseph Copley, 1st Baronet, on 20 June 1779 at St Marylebone. They had five children:
Lady Harriet Margaret Hamilton (1780–1803), died unmarried.
Lady Maria Hamilton (1782–1814), died unmarried.
Lady Catherine Elizabeth Hamilton (1784–1812), married George Hamilton-Gordon, 4th Earl of Aberdeen and had issue.
James Hamilton, Viscount Hamilton (1786–1814), married Harriet Douglas, granddaughter of James Douglas, 14th Earl of Morton and had issue.
Lord Claud Hamilton (1787–1808), died unmarried.

House of Commons
Hamilton went abroad in about 1781, and returned in the late summer of 1783. Through the influence of John Buller, his wife's uncle, he was returned as a Tory Member of Parliament for East Looe in December, taking the seat vacated by William Graves. His maiden speech was in opposition to the East India Bill of the Fox-North Coalition. He was naturally a supporter of his friend Pitt's first ministry. At the 1784, he was put in for St Germans, another Cornish borough, by his half-brother Edward Eliot. Though deeply attached to Pitt, he possessed great independence of character and something of his uncle's stiff pride. A staunch supporter of Warren Hastings, he spoke in 1788 against a bill to regulate (and thereby sanction) the slave trade, and in favour of its abolition. On 9 October 1789, he succeeded his childless uncle as Earl of Abercorn, and entered the House of Lords as Viscount Hamilton.

House of Lords 
He was created 1st Marquess of Abercorn on 15 October 1790, doubtless due to his political connections. His first wife died in 1791, and he married his first cousin, Lady Cecil Hamilton, daughter of Rev. Hon. George Hamilton, on 4 March 1792. She was granted a Royal Warrant of Precedence on 27 October 1789 to assume the precedence of an earl's daughter, through his influence with Pitt; Sir Nathaniel Wraxall suggests that she was Hamilton's mistress before the death of his first wife, and that George III was very reluctant to make out the warrant. They had one child:

Lady Cecil Frances Hamilton (19 July 1795 – 7 July 1860), married William Howard, 4th Earl of Wicklow and had issue.

He was sworn of the Privy Council of Ireland on 7 February 1794. Most of the Abercorn lands were in Ireland, and the Marquess made great efforts to build a voting bloc in the Irish Parliament from County Donegal and County Tyrone, although with relatively little success. He was criticised for being a harsh landlord, and in 1805 he unsuccessfully tried to have a High Court judge  who had raised the issue removed from the Bench; the judge's conduct was reckless in the extreme, as Abercorn has been called "the last man who could be attacked with impunity".  

His marriage to Lady Cecil was not a success; they separated in 1798 and were divorced by Act of Parliament in April 1799. The next month, she married Joseph Copley, the brother of Abercorn's first wife. Abercorn married Lady Anne Jane Gore (1763–1827), daughter of Arthur Gore, 2nd Earl of Arran, on 3 April 1800.

He was invested as a Knight of the Garter on 17 January 1805.

George W. E. Russell provided the following sketch of his aristocratic character:This admirable nobleman always went out shooting in his Blue Ribbon, and required his housemaids to wear white kid gloves when they made his bed. Before he married his first cousin, Miss Cecil Hamilton, he induced the Crown to confer on her the titular rank of an Earl's daughter, that he might not marry beneath his position; and, when he discovered that she contemplated eloping, he sent a message begging her to take the family coach, as it ought never to be said that Lady Abercorn left her husband's roof in a hack chaise.

Lord Abercorn died on 27 January 1818 at Bentley Priory, Stanmore, and was buried on 5 February at Stanmore. His titles passed to his grandson, James Hamilton.

Notes and references

  - AB-ADAM to BASING

External links

Abercorn papers

1756 births
1818 deaths
Alumni of Pembroke College, Cambridge
Knights of the Garter
Members of the Inner Temple
Hamilton, John
Members of the Privy Council of Ireland
People educated at Harrow School
Hamilton, John
Hamilton, John
Hamilton, John
John